Debruhl-Marshall House is a historic home located in Columbia, South Carolina. It was built in 1820, and is a two-story, five bay, brick Greek Revival style dwelling. It has a gabled slate roof and full basement. The front facade features a three bay portico supported by four massive Doric order columns.

It was added to the National Register of Historic Places in 1972. It is located in the Columbia Historic District II.

References

External links

Historic American Buildings Survey in South Carolina
Houses on the National Register of Historic Places in South Carolina
Greek Revival houses in South Carolina
Houses completed in 1820
Houses in Columbia, South Carolina
National Register of Historic Places in Columbia, South Carolina
Historic district contributing properties in South Carolina